Mitsubishi Forklift Trucks is the brand name used for a range of materials handling products manufactured and distributed by Mitsubishi Heavy Industries (MHI) and several of its Mitsubishi Caterpillar Forklifts subsidiaries: MCFE Mitsubishi Caterpillar Forklift Europe, MCFA Mitsubishi Caterpillar Forklift America, MLAP Mitsubishi Logisnext Asia Pacific, and MCFC Mitsubishi Caterpillar Forklift (Shanghai).

History
The Mitsubishi Forklift Trucks brand was formed in 1992 when MHI entered a joint venture with Caterpillar Inc.

In February 2013, Mitsubishi Forklift Trucks has signed an agreement with the Japanese company Nichiyu to create Mitsubishi Nichiyu Forklift Co., Ltd.

As of 2018, Mitsubishi Forklift Trucks operates as a subsidiary of Mitsubishi Logisnext.

Products

Mitsubishi Forklift Trucks products cover a range of counterbalance forklift trucks and warehouse equipment, including:

• IC engine counterbalance trucks (diesel and LPG)

• Electric counterbalance trucks

• Powered pallet trucks

• Stackers

• Order pickers

• Reach and multi-way trucks

Although many of the designs and components are common to all regions, there are some differences in the product ranges across continents.

Production facilities
Worldwide headquarters:

Nagaokakyō, Japan

Manufacturing centres:

Pamplona, Spain
Almere, the Netherlands
Järvenpää, Finland
Marengo, Illinois
Houston, Texas
Ōmihachiman, Japan
Dalian, China

References

External links
 
 Mitsubishi Forklift Trucks

Forklift truck manufacturers
Mitsubishi companies
Japanese brands
Companies based in Kyoto Prefecture
Japanese companies established in 1992
Mitsubishi Heavy Industries